Christopher Cerrone (born March 5, 1984) is an American composer based in New York City. He was a 2014 finalist for the Pulitzer Prize, a 2014 Fromm Foundation commission recipient, a 2015 Rome Prize winner in Music Composition, and has received numerous awards from ASCAP.

Biography
Cerrone was born in Huntington, New York, United States. He studied music composition at the Manhattan School of Music with Nils Vigeland and Reiko Fueting, and then earned his Masters and Doctoral degrees at Yale studying with Martin Bresnick, David Lang, Christopher Theofanidis, Ingram Marshall, and Ezra Laderman.

In 2014 Cerrone's opera Invisible Cities based on Italo Calvino's novel Invisible Cities was produced by the Los Angeles-based opera company The Industry, the LA Dance Project, and Sennheiser. The production received glowing reviews and had a sold-out run of performances. Cerrone has received commissions from ensembles including eighth blackbird, the Los Angeles Philharmonic, Present Music, and he has been the Composer-in-Residence with the Albany Symphony Orchestra, and with Exploring the Metropolis/ConEdison.

Cerrone was a founding member and co-Artistic Director of Red Light New Music and currently a member of the composers' collective Sleeping Giant.

His works are published by Project Schott New York and Schott Music.

Selected works
Opera
 In a Grove (2022) for four singers (SCtTB), nine instruments, and electronics
 Invisible Cities (2009–2013) for four solo voices, chamber choir, chamber orchestra, and electronics
 All Wounds Bleed (2011) for soprano, mezzo-soprano, tenor, and piano

Orchestra
 High Windows (2013) concerto for string orchestra
 Still Life with Violin and Orchestra (2010) for violin and orchestra
 Invisible Overture (2008) for orchestra

Chamber orchestra
 Flows Beneath (2012) for steel pan ensemble and 10 person chamber orchestra

Solo and chamber 
 Double Happiness (2012) for electric guitar, percussion, and electronics
 Memory Palace (2012) for solo percussionist and electronics
 Recovering (2011/12) for clarinet, bassoon, trumpet, trombone, vibraphone, violin, and double bass
 The Night Mare (2011) for flute, clarinet, percussion, piano, violin, cello, and electronics
 Hoyt–Schermerhorn (2010) for solo piano and electronics
 Reading a Wave (2008/2010) for nine instruments placed throughout the audience.
 Variations on a Still Point (2006/7) for guitar, saxophone, percussion, and piano

Vocal
 I will learn to love a person (2013) for soprano, saxophone (or clarinet), percussion, and piano or soprano and piano
 That Night with the Green Sky (2012) for soprano and piano
 How to Breathe Underwater (2011) for baritone, trumpet, trombone, bass clarinet, and pre-recorded electronics
 Requiem [for K.V.] (2007/2009) for solo amplified voice and live electronics. Text by Kurt Vonnegut.
 three e.e. cummings poems (2004) for SSAATTBB choir

Awards and nominations
Ovation Awards
2014: Nominated for Book and for Lyrics/Music for an Original Musical for The Industry's production of Invisible Cities

References

External links
 Official website
 Eamdc.com
 'Ep. 40: Christopher Cerrone, composer' Interview by Tigran Arakelyan

American male classical composers
Living people
1984 births
American classical composers
21st-century American composers
21st-century classical composers
People from Huntington, New York
Manhattan School of Music alumni
Yale School of Music alumni
Pupils of Martin Bresnick
Classical musicians from New York (state)
21st-century American male musicians